Leoninus may refer to:
 Léonin (fl. 1150s—? 1201), the first known significant composer of polyphonic organum
 Elbertus Leoninus (1519 or 1520–1598), Dutch jurist and statesman who helped negotiate the Pacification of Ghent

Species Latin names

 , a butterfly species in the genus Charaxes
 Pluteus leoninus, the lion shield, a mushroom found growing on dead wood in Europe and North Africa
 , a spider species in the genus Thalassius

See also
 Leonina (disambiguation)
 Leonine (disambiguation)
 Leoninum